Northern State Hospital is a historic hospital campus in Sedro-Woolley, Washington. It is listed on the National Register of Historic Places. The building was designed by Seattle architects Saunders and Lawton. The grounds were designed by the Olmsted Brothers landscape architecture firm. It is located 4 miles northeast from the city. 

A plaque at the cemetery site down the hill from the hospital reads:In respectful memory of the 1,487 Northern State Hospital patients interred in these grounds. May they now rest in peace with dignity. 1913 - 1972The campus includes a dairy, silos, and work buildings.

A few of the remaining buildings are currently being used for job corps, titled "Cascades Job Corps College and Career Academy".

See also
National Register of Historic Places listings in Skagit County, Washington

References

Further reading
  

Hospitals in Washington (state)
National Register of Historic Places in Skagit County, Washington